

The M1135 Nuclear, Biological, Chemical Reconnaissance Vehicle (NBCRV) provides nuclear, biological and chemical detection and surveillance for battlefield hazard visualization.

The NBCRV provides situational awareness to increase the combat power of the Stryker Brigade Combat Team (SBCT). The core of the NBCRV is its on-board integrated NBC sensor suite and integrated meteorological system. An NBC positive overpressure system (where interior air pressure is higher than ambient air pressure outside, rather than vice versa) minimizes cross-contamination of samples and detection instruments, provides crew protection, and allows extended operations at MOPP 0. It replaces the M93 Fox vehicle.

The NBCRV detects and collects chemical and biological contamination in its local environment on the move through point detection (Chemical Biological Mass Spectrometer (CBMS) and Joint Biological Point Detection System (JBPDS)), and at a distance through the use of a standoff detector (JSLSCAD) . It automatically integrates contamination information from detectors with input from on-board navigation and meteorological systems and automatically transmits digital NBC warning messages through the Mission Command System.

As of 2010, the U.S. Army does not plan to field Stryker Double V-Hull (DVH) versions of the NBCRV in Afghanistan.

Chemical Biological Mass Spectrometer (CBMS), built by Hamilton Sundstrand, is a detection system for chemical warfare agents and biological warfare agents. CBMS was originally developed by a team led by Oak Ridge National Laboratory.

On 25 July 2013, Iraq requested the sale of 50 M1135 NBC Reconnaissance Vehicles for $900 million.

In October 2013, the U.S. Army decided to reduce the overall number of M1135 Strykers it will procure from 417 to 307 vehicles.

References

See also

 List of U.S. military vehicles by model number

Armored personnel carriers of the United States
Post–Cold War armored fighting vehicles of the United States
General Dynamics land vehicles
Wheeled reconnaissance vehicles
Wheeled armoured fighting vehicles
Mowag Piranha